is a Japanese fencer. He competed in the individual and team foil events at the 1972 Summer Olympics.

References

External links
 

1943 births
Living people
Japanese male foil fencers
Olympic fencers of Japan
Fencers at the 1972 Summer Olympics
Asian Games medalists in fencing
Fencers at the 1974 Asian Games
Asian Games silver medalists for Japan
Medalists at the 1974 Asian Games
20th-century Japanese people
21st-century Japanese people